The Cazneaux Tree, also known as Cazneaux's Tree, is a Eucalyptus camaldulensis or river red gum that was made famous by the photographer Harold Cazneaux. It is in the Australian state of South Australia in the locality of Flinders Ranges near Wilpena Pound.

The tree was listed by the National Trust of South Australia as significant tree number 239 on the trust's Register of Significant Trees because of "its outstanding aesthetic beauty".

The tree was photographed in 1937 by Cazneaux in a picture entitled The Spirit of Endurance which brought him international recognition. The tree is now an important landmark and a tourist drawcard for the area, attracting photographers and artists.

A plaque funded by Cazneaux's grandson, Dick Smith, was placed at the site in 1991.

See also
List of named Eucalyptus trees
List of individual trees

References

Tourist attractions in South Australia
Individual eucalypts
Individual trees in South Australia
Flinders Ranges
Far North (South Australia)